Joan Baptista Xuriguera i Parramona (17 June 1908 – 17 October  1987) was a Catalan writer, translator and linguist.

He was born at Menàrguens, La Noguera, the brother of writer Ramon Xuriguera i Parramona, and studied in Lleida. He became a member of the Republican Left of Catalonia and of the Workers and Peasants' Bloc.  After expatriating to France  in 1936, he wrote the autobiographical novel La vida de Joan Ventura, which would be published in 1964-1987. He returned to Catalonia in December 1948.

His works include the novels Desembre and Hilds, and numerous plays for which Xuriguera won several awards.

He died at Barcelona in 1987.

External links
 Webpage devoted to Joan Baptista Xuriguera at LletrA (UOC), Catalan Literature Online (Catalan)

1908 births
1987 deaths
People from Noguera (comarca)
Writers from Catalonia
Linguists from Catalonia
Translators from Catalonia
Translators to Catalan
20th-century translators